The Stokes River, a perennial river of the Glenelg Hopkins catchment, is located in the Western District of Victoria, Australia.

Course and features
The river descends  over its  course.

See also

References 

Glenelg Hopkins catchment
Rivers of Barwon South West (region)
Western District (Victoria)